This is a list of National Register of Historic Places listings in Starr County, Texas.

This is intended to be a complete list of properties and districts listed on the National Register of Historic Places in Starr County, Texas. There are three districts, including one National Historic Landmark (NHL) district, and six individual properties listed on the National Register in the county. All of the districts contain several Recorded Texas Historic Landmarks while the NHL district also holds State Antiquities Landmarks including one that is individually listed on the National Register.

Current listings

The locations of National Register properties and districts may be seen in a mapping service provided.

|}

See also

National Register of Historic Places listings in Texas
List of National Historic Landmarks in Texas
Recorded Texas Historic Landmarks in Starr County

References

External links

Registered Historic Places
Starr County
Buildings and structures in Starr County, Texas